Worcester City Council elections are held three years out of every four, with a third of the council elected each time. Worcester City Council is the local authority for the non-metropolitan district of Worcester in Worcestershire, England. Since the last boundary changes in 2004, 35 councillors have been elected from 15 wards.

Political control
The city of Worcester was an ancient borough which had held city status from time immemorial. When elected county councils were established in 1889, Worcester became a county borough, being independent from the surrounding Worcestershire County Council. In 1974, under the Local Government Act 1972, the city had its territory enlarged and became a non-metropolitan district, with Hereford and Worcester County Council providing county-level services. Hereford and Worcester was abolished in 1998, since when a re-established Worcestershire County Council has been the upper-tier authority for Worcester. The first elections to the reconstituted city council were held in 1973, initially acting as a shadow authority until the new arrangements took effect on 1 April 1974. Political control of the council since 1974 has been held by the following parties:

Leadership
The leaders of the council since 2002 have been:

Council elections
1973 Worcester City Council election
1975 Worcester City Council election
1976 Worcester City Council election
1978 Worcester City Council election
1979 Worcester City Council election (New ward boundaries)
1980 Worcester City Council election
1982 Worcester City Council election
1983 Worcester City Council election
1984 Worcester City Council election
1986 Worcester City Council election
1987 Worcester City Council election (City boundary changes took place but the number of seats remained the same)
1988 Worcester City Council election
1990 Worcester City Council election
1991 Worcester City Council election
1992 Worcester City Council election
1994 Worcester City Council election
1995 Worcester City Council election
1996 Worcester City Council election
1998 Worcester City Council election
1999 Worcester City Council election
2000 Worcester City Council election
2002 Worcester City Council election
2003 Worcester City Council election
2004 Worcester City Council election (New ward boundaries)
2006 Worcester City Council election
2007 Worcester City Council election
2008 Worcester City Council election
2010 Worcester City Council election
2011 Worcester City Council election
2012 Worcester City Council election
2014 Worcester City Council election
2015 Worcester City Council election
2016 Worcester City Council election
2018 Worcester City Council election
2019 Worcester City Council election
2021 Worcester City Council election
2022 Worcester City Council election

District result maps

By-election results

References

External links
Worcester City Council website
By-election results

 
Local elections
Council elections in Worcestershire
District council elections in England
Council elections in Hereford and Worcester